Slumber is another word for Sleep

Slumber may also refer to:
laziness, indolence or inaction
Slumber (dog), prize winning Old English Sheepdog
Slumber (band) at Okeechobee Music & Arts Festival
"Slumber", award-winning single by Christian Rock band Needtobreathe
"Slumber", signature single of Malaysian band OAG (band)
"Slumber", song by Die Monster Die from the album Withdrawal Method
"Slumber", song by Elvin Jones from the album Genesis
"Slumber", song by Bad Religion from album Punk Rock Songs
Slumber (film), a horror film released in 2017
Slumber Tsogwane (born 1959), Botswanan politician